Víctor Manuel Mora García (born November 24, 1944) is a retired long-distance runner from Colombia. He won the gold medal in the men's 5.000 metres event in (14:32) minutes at the 1974 Central American and Caribbean Games, and competed for his native country at two consecutive Summer Olympics, starting in 1972 (Munich, West Germany).

He also won the Saint Silvester Road Race in São Paulo in 1972, 1973, 1975 and 1981.

Personal bests
10,000 metres — 27.55.72 (1976)
Marathon — 2:12:55 (1981)

Achievements

References

External links
 

1944 births
Living people
Colombian male long-distance runners
Colombian male steeplechase runners
Athletes (track and field) at the 1972 Summer Olympics
Athletes (track and field) at the 1976 Summer Olympics
Olympic athletes of Colombia
Athletes (track and field) at the 1967 Pan American Games
Athletes (track and field) at the 1971 Pan American Games
Athletes (track and field) at the 1979 Pan American Games
Athletes (track and field) at the 1987 Pan American Games
Pan American Games competitors for Colombia
Sportspeople from Bogotá
Central American and Caribbean Games gold medalists for Colombia
Competitors at the 1974 Central American and Caribbean Games
Central American and Caribbean Games medalists in athletics
20th-century Colombian people